Prince Antoni Benedykt Konstanty Lubomirski (1718–1761) was a Polish szlachcic.

He was the landowner of the Połonne, Międzyrzecz and Miropol estates. Major General of the Crown Army,  Lieutenant General from 1753, Great Sword-bearer of the Crown from 1754. He signed the election of Stanisław Leszczyński in 1733.

He was Marshal of the Sejm, 3 October – 14 November 1746.

He was awarded the Order of the White Eagle on 3 August 1757 in Warsaw

References

1718 births
1761 deaths
Antoni Benedykt Lubomirski
Generals of the Polish–Lithuanian Commonwealth
Members of the Sejm of the Polish–Lithuanian Commonwealth
Recipients of the Order of the White Eagle (Poland)